Muhammad Ahmed Abboud Pasha (1899–1963) was an Egyptian entrepreneur and business magnate.

Abboud received his education in engineering from the University of Glasgow. He began work in pre-WWI Ottoman Iraq in irrigation. During World War I, he worked in railroad planning in Syria and Palestine. Abboud established a construction firm in Egypt in 1924, which originally focused on contract work on government-financed irrigation canals. Between 1929 and 1933, his construction company developed improvements to height on the Aswan Dam. His company also found success doing work on a plethora of state projects.

By the 1940s, he owned the Sugar Company, the Khedival Mail Line as well as the Egyptian General Omnibus Company. In addition, he was the largest shareholder of Banque Misr, and obtained a seat on its board of directors in 1950. In the same year, he became the first Egyptian director of the Suez Canal Company, which was then owned by foreigners.

Abboud received the noble title of Pasha on 14 February 1931. He was also active in politics. He became a parliamentary deputy in 1926, representing the Wafd Party which he supported financially until Mustafa el-Nahhas became its leader in 1927. Abboud later reconciled with the party and started supporting it once again during its final years in power, and was close to party strongman Fuad Siraj al-Din.

Ahmed Abboud Pasha died in London in 1963, and was reported to be among the ten richest men in the world at the time of his death.

References

General

Specific

1899 births
1963 deaths
20th-century Egyptian businesspeople
Egyptian industrialists
Suez Canal
Egyptian pashas